Samanza is a town in eastern Ivory Coast. It is a sub-prefecture of Daoukro Department in Iffou Region, Lacs District. The border of Zanzan District is 200 metres northwest of the town.

Samanza was a commune until March 2012, when it became one of 1126 communes nationwide that were abolished.

In 2014, the population of the sub-prefecture of Samanza was 10,260.

Villages
The 9 villages of the sub-prefecture of Samanza and their population in 2014 are:
 Agba-Tanoukro (137)
 Aka-Comoékro (1 654)
 Akpokro (332)
 Ekra-Kpinkro (357)
 Nouffoukro (550)
 Ouakabessi (833)
 Samanza (2 546)
 Tiokonou (850)
 Zanzansou (3 001)

References

Sub-prefectures of Iffou
Former communes of Ivory Coast